Vladimir Andreyevich Artemyev ( in Saint Petersburg - 11 September 1962 in Moscow) was a Soviet Russian rocket scientist at the Gas Dynamics Laboratory, and was one of the inventors of the Katyusha. The first rocket propelled by smokeless trotyl-pyroxylin powder was launched under his direction in 1928. Artem'ev crater is named in his honour.

Biography

Early Years and Service in the Russian Imperial Army 

In 1925 Vladimir graduated from the 1st St Petersburg 
Gymnasium and volunteered for the Russo-Japanese War. For his valour he was rewarded with the 4th class Cross of St. George and promoted to the rank of non-commissioned officer.

On  he graduated from military school in the rank of second lieutenant and commissioned to the Brest Fortress artillery unit. There he headed the loading room and engaged in experiments with flares. He installed seven aluminium parachute flares into a rocket head, his invention exceeded several standard missiles in the illuminating power. On  he was promoted to the rank of lieutenant. Then he served as an engineer under chief technology officer at the GRAU.

Rocket Engineering 
After the October Revolution Artemyev didn’t leave the country. In 1920 he acquainted Nikolai Tihomirov and soon became his main assistant. In Spring 1920 Tikhomirov and Artemyev equipped a small laboratory on Tikhvinskaya street in Moscow and conducted a series of experiments with charcoal gunpowder. The scientists financed the research with their own money, to support the laboratory they crafted and sold toys and bicycle supplies. In March 1921 Tikhomirov decided to modify the laboratory and engage in rocket engineering. His main interest was the solid-propellant rocket. In the same year, the scientists started working on air projectiles.

On 22 September 1922 Vladimir Artemyev was arrested on charges of espionage, inaction and negligence that undermined the Red Army’s supply in artillery and projectiles. Under the Special Council of the NKVD decision from 10 June 1923, he was sentenced to 3 years at the Solovki prison camp.

In 1924 Artemyev was released from the camp and returned to work at the Tikhomirov’s laboratory. In the same year he offered to construct propellant charges from smokeless gunpowder based on non-volatile solvents. In 1925 the laboratory relocated to Leningrad. On 3 March 1928 the first rocket on a smokeless gunpowder propellant was tested at one of the training areas near Leningrad. According to Artemyev, that configuration became the prototype of the missiles for ‘Katyusha’. In July 1928 the laboratory was renamed into the Gas Dynamics Laboratory (GDL) of the Revolutionary Military Council. Since that year the laboratory has been subjected to the Red Army Office of Military Inventions of the Technical Staff of the Chief of Armaments. In 1932 Ivan Kleymyonov was assigned to the director’s post. In September 1933 GIRD and GDL merged into the Reactive Scientific Research Institute (RNII). Artemyev designed RS-82 fin-stabilized rockets with extended fins. In 1937-1938 Polikarpov I-15, Polikarpov I-16, Polikarpov I-153 were equipped with jet-propelled projectiles. In Summer 1939 RS-82 rockets were successfully used in the Battles of Khalkhin Gol.

Artemyev was in charge of rocket construction. On 23 March 1943 he was awarded with the 1st class USSR State Prize in honour of his major improvements in mortar tubes and ammunition.

During World War II Artemyev kept working as a military engineer. In 1945 with S. F. Fonaryov he co-created an antisubmarine mortar with depth rocket-propelled missiles. After the war Artemyev kept working on rocket construction at research institutes and laboratories.

Vladimir Artemyev died on 11 September 1962. The ashes were placed in the columbarium at the Novodevichy Cemetery.

Awards 
 The Order of the Red Banner of Labour (24 November 1942);
 the 1st class Order of the Patriotic War (18 November 1944);
 the 2d class Stalin Prize (23 March 1941);
 the 1st class Stalin Prize (23 March 1943).

Memory
The Artem'ev lunar crater on the far side of the Moon was named after the scientist.

References

Sources 
 

1885 births
1962 deaths
Scientists from Saint Petersburg
Stalin Prize winners
Recipients of the Cross of St. George
Recipients of the Order of the Red Banner of Labour
Soviet scientists
Burials at Novodevichy Cemetery
Soviet inventors
Rocket scientists